Casasco is a comune (municipality) in the Province of Alessandria in the Italian region Piedmont, located about  east of Turin and about  southeast of Alessandria.  

Casasco borders the following municipalities: Avolasca, Brignano-Frascata, Garbagna, Momperone, and Montemarzino.

References

Cities and towns in Piedmont